Transmission rate can be:

In the context of computer data: Bit rate
In the context of infectious diseases: Transmission risks and rates